The South American section of the 2018 FIVB Volleyball Men's Challenger Cup qualification acted as a qualifier for the 2018 FIVB Volleyball Men's Challenger Cup, for national teams which are members of the Confederación Sudamericana de Voleibol (CSV). The tournament was held in Santiago, Chile from 18 to 20 May 2018. The winners Chile qualified for the 2018 Challenger Cup.

Qualification
4 CSV national teams entered qualification.

 (Hosts)

Venue
 Centro Nacional de Entrenamiento Olímpico, Santiago, Chile

Pool standing procedure
 Number of matches won
 Match points
 Sets ratio
 Points ratio
 Result of the last match between the tied teams

Match won 3–0 or 3–1: 3 match points for the winner, 0 match points for the loser
Match won 3–2: 2 match points for the winner, 1 match point for the loser

Round robin
All times are Chile Standard Time (UTC−04:00).

|}

|}

Final standing
{| class="wikitable" style="text-align:center"
|-
!width=40|Rank
!width=180|Team
|- bgcolor=#ccffcc
|1
|style="text-align:left"|
|-
|2
|style="text-align:left"|
|-
|3
|style="text-align:left"|
|-
|4
|style="text-align:left"|
|}

References

External links
2018 Challenger Cup South American Qualifier – official website

2018 FIVB Volleyball Men's Challenger Cup qualification
FIVB
2018 in Chilean sport
International volleyball competitions hosted by Chile
FIVB Volleyball Men's Challenger Cup qualification